Listed here are notable end-user computer applications intended for use with numerical or data analysis:

Numerical-software packages

General-purpose computer algebra systems

Interface-oriented

Language-oriented

Historically significant
 Expensive Desk Calculator written for the TX-0 and PDP-1 in the late 1950s or early 1960s.
 S is an (array-based) programming language with strong numerical support. R is an implementation of the S language.

See also

References

Lists of software
Mathematics-related lists
Software